In marketing, a blind taste test is often used as a tool for companies to compare their brand to another brand. For example, the Pepsi Challenge is a famous taste test that has been run by Pepsi since 1975. Additionally, taste tests are sometimes used as a tool by companies to develop their brand or new products.

Blind taste tests are ideal for goods such as food or wine that are consumed directly. Researchers use blind taste tests to obtain information about customers' perceptions and preferences on the goods. Blind taste test can be used to: 
 Track views on a product over time 
 assess changes or improvements made to a product 
 gauge reactions to a new product

Overview 
Blind taste tests require a "blind testing" meaning the people taking the blind taste test are unaware of the identity of the brand being tested, or if done at home this can be as simple as a blindfold over the person taking the test. This means that any bias, preconceived ideas about a particular brand or food, is eliminated. The people taking the test will also be unaware of any changes done to the product.

In the famous Pepsi Challenge, people took a sip from two different unlabelled glasses, not knowing which was Coke and which was Pepsi.

Types of blind taste tests

There are two types of blind taste tests:
In a single blind taste test, experimenters know information about the participants, but the participants know nothing about the experimenters or the product they are testing. The aforementioned Pepsi Challenge is an example of a single blind test.
In a double blind taste test, the experimenters know nothing about the participants, and the participants know nothing about the experimenters or the product they are testing.

In popular culture
Taste tests are commonly employed by the public television show America's Test Kitchen and its spin-off series Cook's Country, typically administered by Jack Bishop.

References

Marketing techniques
Scientific method